Rakon Limited is a technology company founded in 1967 that designs and manufactures frequency control products, primarily quartz crystals and temperature-compensated crystal oscillators (TCXO), oven controlled crystal oscillators (OCXO) and voltage controlled crystal oscillators (VCXO). Its head office is in Auckland, New Zealand with wholly owned subsidiaries in the United Kingdom and France with joint venture operations in India and China. The company specialises in supplying frequency-control products to the GPS industry.

History 

Rakon was founded on 4 April 1967 by Warren Robinson. Robinson had previously operated a business manufacturing marine radios, Marlin Electronics. These marine radios required between 6-12 quartz crystals with each region within New Zealand requiring a different set of frequencies.

The only source for these crystals was the NZPO (New Zealand Post Office), and delivery times were often measured in months, which was an ongoing problem for Robinson in his ability to supply his radios. Warren Robinson realising there was an opportunity to compete with the NZPO sold Marlin Electronics to Autocrat Radio and went on to found Rakon Industries (RIL) a few years later (1967). Initially, the New Zealand government blocked Robinson's application to import crystal manufacturing equipment as they didn't wish there to be undue competition to the post office, however by 1967 Robinson was able to secure an import license for the equipment and started manufacturing quartz crystals, in his garage, to supply the local radio market.

Early growth 
By supplying quality crystals on short lead-times, Rakon grew quickly, riding the wave of growth in the radio-communications industry. By 1971, Rakon had moved into its own premises and employed over 30 staff; it had also begun exporting the crystals to Australia and South East Asia. In 1972 Warren Robinson set up a second manufacturing plant in Singapore to supply the growing markets of Thailand, Malaysia, Philippines and Taiwan.

Crystal crash 
Around 1980, Warren Robinson's eldest son, Brent Robinson, joined Rakon as Managing Director. Brent was made responsible for the crystal manufacturing business, while Warren focused on his other expanding business, Rakon Computers, which at the time owned the distribution rights for Unix in Australia and New Zealand.

Around this time, a new technology began being widely adopted in radio designs, frequency synthesis. This meant that rather than a radio requiring a pair of crystals for every frequency (one for transmit and a second for receive), only one single crystal was required. The impact of this was that Rakon's core crystal business was in rapid decline, with the total market size shrinking to a mere 10% of its previous size.

TCXO development 
Brent Robinson immediately started looking for new related technologies that Rakon could adopt to turn around the rapidly falling sales. In the mid-1980s, Brent came across a product type known as temperature-compensated crystal oscillators. These were mainly being manufactured in Japan at the time and were used, in particular, in cellular phones. With NEC in Australia looking for a local supplier of TCXOs, Brent committed Rakon to developing a product of equivalent performance to anything that could be sourced out of Japan.

By the late 1980s, Rakon was supplying TCXOs to NEC Australia's Melbourne factory. The supply of these products became the main focus of Rakon's operations, and the entire manufacturing process for quartz crystals was revamped in order to support this new technology. The early TCXOs that Rakon supplied were imitations of the Japanese products, but Rakon was unable to replicate the highly automated manufacturing processes that existed in Japan. Also the performance of these early products, although good enough, was not satisfactory to the young Brent Robinson.

In order to increase the manufacturing volume, reduce the cost and improve the performance of the products, Rakon developed its manufacturing processes. This was largely due to the fact that there was no local industry to teach the Rakon engineers how to do things, and all manufacturing developments had to be done from a blank sheet of paper.

GPS market 
In 1990, Brent's younger brother, Darren Robinson, joined the company as head of marketing. He had been working in Australia in the computer industry and came on board in part to find new customers for the 1ppm TCXO. At around the same time, NEC Australia halted its mobile phone manufacturing and moved its operations back to Japan, dropping Rakon in preference of a local Japanese supplier at the same time.

Initially Darren Robinson canvased all the emerging cellular phone manufacturers in order to find a new customer for their TCXO. It soon became apparent that although the Rakon product out-performed anything else on the market, it was too expensive for any of the high-volume applications Rakon was set up to support.

In 1991, the Robinson brothers came across an advertisement for a hand-held GPS unit from a company called Magellan. After making contact with Magellan, the Robinsons were quickly made aware that the emerging GPS market was seeking for a high stability frequency reference, in a small package available in volume (which at the time was tens of thousands of units).

Initial samples were approved, and volume orders placed shortly afterward. Rakon immediately began approaching all the major GPS suppliers in North America, and within a couple of years, was supplying frequency references widely in the GPS industry.

Rockwell had been instrumental in the development and deployment of the GPS system and were the technology leaders at the time.

Public listing 
Rakon continued to focus on developing products for the GPS market. In 2006, they claimed to still hold over 50% market share in the autonomous GPS market (GPS which functions without assistance from the CDMA phone network). There had been massive growth in the number of GPS devices available between 1990 and 2006.

In early 2006, Rakon announced they would list on the New Zealand stock exchange, and on 13 April, released their IPO prospectus. The IPO generated a lot of interest in the New Zealand market and although no official numbers were released the listing was heavily over subscribed. The IPO price was $1.60 and shares commenced trading on 16 May at $2.30 per share. On 16 May 2007 the share price opened at $5.30 and reached a high a few days later of $5.80. Rakon is often referred to in media as the share market darling, although some commentators point to the lack of other high growth stocks on the NZX as a reason for Rakon's popularity.

Overseas expansion and recent financial performance 
In March 2007, Rakon acquired the frequency-control products division of C-MAC Microtechnology. This acquisition gave Rakon a European-based operation, including 2 factories located in the UK and France. The new business unit specialised in other forms of wireless communications and allowed Rakon to become less dependent on the GPS market, and expanded Rakon's product range greatly to include oven-controlled crystal oscillators (OCXO), voltage-controlled crystal oscillators (VCXO), the Pluto ASIC and a range of low performance commodity products.

In 2008 Rakon formed a joint venture with (Centum Electronics) to manufacture high value telecommunications infrastructure products and to commercialise Rakon France's R&D programme. Also in 2008, Rakon formed a joint venture with (Timemaker) to vertically integrate quartz crystal supply.

In 2010 Rakon acquired the company (Temex) in France, supplying frequency control solutions for the space market.

In 2011 Rakon opened a joint venture facility, Rakon Crystal Chengdu, in China. The investment was an unsuccessful one, with Rakon exiting from its 80% stake in the Chengdu factory in July 2013.

Between 2012-2014, Rakon suffered a drop in revenue and margins and made a series of losses, shedding up to 86% of its market capitalisation compared to five years prior.

In August 2013, the NZ Shareholders Association demanded the resignation of Rakon's Chairman, Bryan Mogridge, and another director, Darren Robinson (son of founder Warren Robinson), after the company announced poor results and a $30m write down of assets.

Rakon was also fined $30,000 by the NZX after it failed to maintain continuous disclosure obligations over selling 80% of its shareholding in its Chengdu factory.

Rakon returned to a small profit in November 2015 but with much reduced revenues compared to pre-GFC levels.

Weapons components controversy 
Since 2005, Rakon has been the subject a number of allegations relating to the use of their products in military applications. Rakon has never denied that they supply products into military applications and have, at various times, stated this accounts for 1% of their output, or 10% of their revenue.

In August 2005, the New Zealand Herald quoted Rakon Marketing Director, Darren Robinson, as saying that the company's technology went into "smart bombs and missiles" used by the US military. Rakon denied the claims, stating the company was not privy to the "end-use systems, equipment or applications used by its customers."

In May 2006 the New Zealand Herald  ran a large expose around Rakon products being supplied to Rockwelll for incorporation in United States Armed Forces 'smart bombs'. The claims were based around the facts that Rakon had known of the end-use of their products since 1994 and may in fact be in breach of New Zealand export restrictions.

In July 2006, Rakon was the target of by Global Peace and Justice Auckland (GPJA). During the Israeli attacks on Lebanon in July 2006, GPJA issued a media release appealing "to the Prime Minister to close the loophole which allows New Zealand's Rakon Industries to export parts for Israeli bombs being dropped on Lebanon and Palestine.".

Rakon continues to maintain that their products had not been designed for military use and the question of where they were used was up to their customers to answer. Rakon listed Rockwell Collins as a customer in their IPO prospectus. In June 2006, the New Zealand Ministry of Foreign Affairs and Trade cleared Rakon products for export, stating that they were unlikely to have been specifically designed for military use.

The Rakon share price saw a significant rise after the Herald story went to press. However, various peace activist groups have maintained calls for Rakon to be prohibited from supplying any products to companies involved in the manufacture of weapons or weapons-related systems.

World's smallest GPS 
In January 2006, Rakon actually released the world's smallest GPS RF Front End Module, which is a component in a GPS system; however, various media sources slightly misrepresented the title of the release - stating "Worlds smallest GPS Receiver".

This GPS module allows systems designers to connect an antenna and GPS baseband to the Rakon module and create a small, simple GPS receiver. The concept is that all the 'difficult' radio frequency design is done by Rakon, and the equipment manufacturer can focus on their application, rather than designing GPS. Rakon has not reported any specific sales of the GPS module but claims there is still significant interest in it.

References 

Military industry
Manufacturing companies of New Zealand
Companies listed on the New Zealand Exchange